Blanga may refer to:
 Blanga language, an Austronesian language of the Solomon Islands
 Blanga (pottery), a type of earthenware used in island Southeast Asia